William Wright Armstrong (October 27, 1920 – October 3, 1976) was an American football guard who played one season with the Brooklyn Dodgers of the National Football League. He played college football at the University of California, Los Angeles and attended Hollywood High School in Los Angeles, California.

References

External links
Just Sports Stats

1920 births
1976 deaths
American football guards
UCLA Bruins football players
Brooklyn Dodgers (NFL) players